Iku-Turso ("the eternal Turso"; also known as Iku-Tursas, Iki-Tursas, Meritursas, Tursas, Turisas among others) is a malevolent sea monster in Finnish mythology, best known for appearing in the Kalevala. Nowadays Meritursas means octopus in Finnish, named after Iku-Turso, but originally tursas is an old name for walrus while the more common term is mursu. However, it is more common to see the word  (lit. "ink fish"), the name of its Subclass Coleoidea in Finnish, for the octopus.

Etymology 
The name Turisas is probably an early loanword from the Proto-Germanic *Þurisaz ("giant").

Description
His appearance remains unclear, but he is described with several epithets: partalainen (the one who lives on the brink, or alternatively, the bearded one), Tuonen härkä (the ox of Tuoni, Death), tuhatpää (thousand-headed), tuhatsarvi (thousand-horned). It was sometimes said that he lived in Pohjola, but that may be because Pohjola was often perceived as the home of all evil.

In some versions of the spell The Birth of Nine Diseases Iku-Turso is mentioned as the father of diseases with Loviatar, the blind daughter of Tuoni, the god of death. The Scandinavian giants (þursar, sg. þurs) had the ability to shoot arrows which caused diseases in people. This and the fact that þurs resembles Tursas gives credence to the idea that they may be related. Some runes tell that Meritursas partalainen makes pregnant the Maiden of Air (Ilman impi, Ilmatar). She later gave birth to Väinämöinen, which would make him a truly primeval creature. On the other hand, he is also mentioned as the son of Äijö (a name usually assigned to the God of sky).

As a god of war
In the list of Tavastian gods by Mikael Agricola, he is mentioned as the god of war: Turisas voiton antoi sodast (Turisas brought victory in war). It has been suggested that the god in the list is same as the Scandinavian god of war Tyr; however, this theory is not widely supported today.

In the Kalevala
He is mentioned several times in the Finnish national epic, the Kalevala. In the second cantos he rises from the sea and burns a stack of hay. Later, a giant oak grows from the ashes. The tree grows so large that it hides the sun and the moon and is cut down.

Later, Iku-Turso is summoned by Louhi, the Lady of the North, to stop the theft of the magical artifact Sampo. Väinämöinen, the leader of the plunderers, grabs Iku-Turso from his ears and using magical words makes him promise to never return from the bottom of the sea.

Legacy
One of the three Vetehinen class submarines used by Finland in the Second World War was named after Iku-Turso. After the war the Soviet Union denied Finland the use of submarines, and she was sold to Belgium for scrapping. Other things named after the mythical being are the Asteroid 2828 Iku-Turso and a Finnish metal band Turisas.

In popular culture
Finnish Folk metal band Turisas is named after the war god.
Iku-Turso is featured as a monster in Final Fantasy XI.
In late 2009 the professional wrestling promotion CHIKARA introduced a character named Tursas, based on the mythological being.
 Iku-Turso wreaks havoc in Helsinki in the Donald Duck comic book story The Quest for Kalevala'' by Don Rosa.

See also
Näkki

Footnotes

Bibliography
 

Characters in the Kalevala
Destroyer gods
Finnish gods
Finnish legendary creatures
Sea monsters
War gods